The Sugarland Express is a 1974 American crime drama film directed by Steven Spielberg in his feature film directorial debut. The film follows a woman (Goldie Hawn) and her husband (William Atherton) as they take a police officer (Michael Sacks) hostage and flee across Texas while they try to get to their child before he is placed in foster care. The event partially took place, the story is partially set, and the film was partially shot in Sugar Land, Texas. Other scenes for the film were filmed in San Antonio, Live Oak, Floresville, Pleasanton, Converse and Del Rio, Texas.

The Sugarland Express marks the first collaboration between Spielberg and composer John Williams, who has scored all but five of Spielberg-directed films since; this is the only score he has composed for Spielberg that has never been released as an album, although Williams re-recorded the main theme with Toots Thielemans and the Boston Pops Orchestra for 1991's The Spielberg/Williams Collaboration.

Plot
Lou Jean Poplin visits her incarcerated husband, Clovis Michael Poplin, to tell him that their son will soon be placed in the care of foster parents. Even though he is four months away from being released from prison, she convinces him to escape to assist her in retrieving their child. They hitch a ride from the prison with a couple, but when Texas Department of Public Safety Patrolman Maxwell Slide stops the car, they take the car and run.

When the car crashes, the two felons overpower and kidnap Slide, holding him hostage at the head of a slow-moving and growing caravan, initially of police cars but eventually including news vans, private citizens' vehicles, and helicopters. The Poplins and Slide travel through Beaumont, Dayton, Houston, Cleveland, Conroe, and finally Wheelock, Texas. By holding Slide hostage, the pair are able to continually gas up their car, as well as get food via the drive-through. During the lengthy pursuit, Slide and the pair bond and develop mutual respect for one another.

The Poplins bring Slide to the home of the foster parents, where they encounter numerous officers, including the DPS Captain who has been pursuing them, Captain Harlin Tanner. A pair of Texas Rangers shoot and fatally wound Clovis, and after another car chase, the Texas Department of Public Safety arrests Lou Jean. Patrolman Slide is found unharmed.

An epilogue preceding the closing credits explains that Lou Jean subsequently spent fifteen months of a five-year prison term in a women's correctional facility. Upon getting out, she obtained the right to live with her son, convincing authorities that she was able to do so.

Cast
 Goldie Hawn as Lou Jean Poplin
 William Atherton as Clovis Michael Poplin
 Ben Johnson as Captain Harlin Tanner
 Michael Sacks as Patrolman Maxwell Slide
 Gregory Walcott as Patrolman Ernie Mashburn
 Steve Kanaly as Patrolman Jessup
 Louise Latham as Mrs. Looby
 Dean Smith as Russ Berry

The actual kidnapped patrolman, James Kenneth Crone, played a small role in the film as a deputy sheriff.

Historical accuracy
The film's Lou Jean Poplin and Clovis Michael Poplin are based on the lives of then-21-year-old Ila Fae Holiday/Dent and 22-year-old Robert "Bobby" Dent, respectively. The character of Texas Highway Patrolman Slide is based on then-27-year-old Trooper J. Kenneth Crone. The character of Captain Tanner is based on Texas Highway Patrol Captain Jerry Miller.

In real life, Ila Fae did not break Bobby out of prison – he had been released from prison in April 1969, two weeks before the slow-motion car chase began. Unlike in the film, Bobby died instantly (about an hour later in a Bryan hospital) when he was shot at Ila Fae's parents' house near Wheelock, Texas where they had gone to visit Ila Fae's two children (born from a previous marriage). Ila Fae was sentenced to five years in prison, serving only five months. She died in 1992, in her mid-40s.

Production
Steven Spielberg persuaded co-producers Richard Zanuck and David Brown to let him make his big-screen directorial debut with this true story. A year later, Spielberg's next project for Zanuck and Brown was 1975's blockbuster hit Jaws.

A clip from the Wile E. Coyote/Road Runner cartoon Whoa, Be-Gone! is shown in silence during a scene at a drive-in theater.

This was the first movie to use the Panavision Panaflex camera.

Reception
The Sugarland Express holds an 87% rating on Rotten Tomatoes with an average score of 7.2 out of 10 from 52 reviews. The website's critical consensus reads, "Its plot may ape the countercultural road movies of its era, but Steven Spielberg's feature debut displays many of the crowd-pleasing elements he'd refine in subsequent films."

Roger Ebert gave the film two-and-a-half stars out of four and wrote, "If the movie finally doesn’t succeed, that’s because Spielberg has paid too much attention to all those police cars (and all the crashes they get into), and not enough to the personalities of his characters. We get to know these three people just enough to want to know them better." Gene Siskel of the Chicago Tribune awarded the same two-and-a-half star grade and wrote that "whereas 'Bonnie and Clyde' prompted our sympathy for its heroes because of their winning style, 'The Sugarland Express' asks us to care for Clovis and Lou Jean because they are thick-skulled and because, presumably, every mother has an inherent right to raise her own baby. It doesn't work." Arthur D. Murphy of Variety called Hawn's performance "generally delightful" but found that "something happens to the picture" toward the end as "the story opts for an abrupt series of production number shootouts, as though this was the real purpose in making the film, and all that preceded was introductory filler and vamp. Too bad, for two-thirds of the film is artful, the rest strident." Tom Milne of The Monthly Film Bulletin wrote that it "seems peculiarly contrived ... it may have happened this way in real life, but in the film the fugitives are so unequivocally presented as poor, harmless innocents that the veritable army of police cars absurdly queuing up to be in at the kill looks very much as though both they and the film were taking a sledgehammer to crack a nut."

Other reviews, however, were much more positive. Kevin Thomas of the Los Angeles Times called it "a dazzling, funny, exciting and finally poignant film," and called it "astonishing" what Spielberg, Barwood and Robbins "have managed to accomplish within a simple trek plot. Starting out as a comedy that gradually darkens, 'The Sugarland Express,' which is based on an actual incident, becomes an increasingly disenchanted portrait of contemporary America." Nora Sayre of The New York Times wrote, "Spielberg, the 26-year old director, has built up Texas as a major character in his movie. As the herd of cars races and heaves and crashes through the landscape, the state's personality surfaces like a sperm whale. Mr. Spielberg has also made marvelous use of many Texans, some of whom haven't acted before." Gary Arnold of The Washington Post called it "an exciting new American film—a funny, tense and ultimately touching chase melodrama ... It's an odyssey you may never forget, and you might as well memorize the names of the young filmmakers responsible for it, the 26-year old director, Steven Spielberg, and the 30-year old screenwriters (and no doubt prospective directors), Hal Barwood and Matthew Robbins, because they've made one of the most stunning debuts in Hollywood history." Pauline Kael of The New Yorker wrote that "Spielberg uses his gifts in a very free-and-easy, American way—for humor, and for a physical response to action. He could be that rarity among directors a born entertainer—perhaps a new generation's Howard Hawks. In terms of the pleasure that technical assurance gives an audience, this is one of the most phenomenal début films in the history of movies."

The film grossed $6.5 million in the United States and Canada and $5.5 million overseas for a worldwide gross of $12 million, making it the lowest-grossing film of Spielberg's career.

Awards
The film won the award for Best Screenplay at the 1974 Cannes Film Festival.

See also
 List of American films of 1974

References

External links
 
 
 
 
 Story from the Tuscaloosa News, May 4 1969, about Robert and Ila Dent

1974 films
1974 crime drama films
1974 directorial debut films
1970s crime comedy-drama films
1970s road movies
American chase films
American crime comedy-drama films
American crime drama films
American films based on actual events
American neo-noir films
American road movies
Films scored by John Williams
Films about hijackings
Films directed by Steven Spielberg
Films produced by David Brown
Films produced by Richard D. Zanuck
Films set in 1969
Films set in Houston
Films set in Texas
Films shot in Texas
Films shot in San Antonio
Films with screenplays by Matthew Robbins
Southern Gothic films
Universal Pictures films
The Zanuck Company films
1970s English-language films
1970s American films